Samuel-Novarro House, also known as the Samuel-Novarro Residence, is a historic Mayan Revival single-family dwelling designed by Lloyd Wright in 1928. It is located at 5609 Valley Oak Dr. in the Los Feliz neighborhood of Los Angeles. It is Los Angeles Historic-Cultural Monument #130.

History
Lloyd Wright designed the 2,700-square-foot, three-bedroom, three-bathroom home for Ramon Novarro's manager, Louis Samuel, in 1928 on a 13,267-square-foot hillside lot. When Novarro discovered that Samuel had embezzled funds from him in order to pay for the house, Novarro assumed ownership of it in 1931. He lived there until the late 1930s; in his tenure there, he commissioned Wright to expand the interior as well as the garden, adding a bedroom, music room, and bedroom suite. He also conscripted famed art director Cedric Gibbons to design the interiors in an Art Deco style.

After Novarro vacated, a number of other Hollywood elite occupied the space, including Leonard Bernstein, Jerome Robbins, Betty Comden, and Adolph Green, who rented the home together in 1944 while working on On the Town. Later, restaurateur Michael Chow, producer Charles D. Kasher, and actresses Diane Keaton and Christina Ricci lived in the house; Keaton purchased the home for $1.5 million in 1988, extensively renovating it and/or restoring it per architect Josh Schweitzer, and eventually selling it in the mid-1990s.

In 2005, Christina Ricci purchased the home for $2.979 million, only to sell it a year later for approximately $2,827,500.

In 2014, the home was sold for $3.8 million, then listed again in 2016 for $4,295,000.

In 2019, the residence was on the market once more, with an asking price of $4.3 million.

References

Los Angeles Historic-Cultural Monuments
Houses completed in 1928
Residential buildings completed in 1928
Art Deco architecture in California
Los Feliz, Los Angeles